The Al Nassr Football Club, commonly referred to as Al Nassr, is a Saudi women's football club based in Riyadh, Saudi Arabia. It is the women's football section of Al Nassr FC, and competes in the Saudi Women's Premier League, the top tier of Saudi women's football.

Domestically, Al Nassr (as Al Mamlaka) won the first Saudi Women's Football Championship. Al Nassr plays its home games at the club-owned stadium Mrsool Park.

History
The team was founded as Al Mamlaka WFC. In September 2022, Al Nassr FC purchased the team to play under its name in the coming 2022–23 Saudi Women's Premier League. With its first appearance as Al Nassr, the team defeated Sama 18–0 by the start of the first round.

Players

Current squad

Honours 
Saudi Women's Premier League
Winners (2; record): 2021–22, 2022–23

See also 
 Al Nassr FC
 Saudi Women's Premier League

References 

Football clubs in Riyadh
Women's association football clubs
Association football clubs established in 2022